The women's team competition at the 2010 World Team Judo Championships was held on 31 October in Antalya, Turkey.

Results

Repechage

References

External links
 

Wteam
World 2010
World Women's Team Judo Championships
World Wteam